Ken Cheveldayoff (born April 1, 1965) is a Canadian provincial politician. He is the Saskatchewan Party member of the Legislative Assembly of Saskatchewan for the constituency of Saskatoon Willowgrove. In 2018 he was a candidate for the leadership of the Saskatchewan Party.

Early life and education

Cheveldayoff holds a B.A. (Honours) in Economics and Political Science (1988) and a Masters of Business Administration (1996). He was a parliamentary page in the House of Commons and won the Queen Elizabeth II scholarship for excellence in Parliamentary Studies.

Career

Prior to being elected to public office, Cheveldayoff worked with Western Economic Diversification as a senior business advisor. He is also the majority shareholder in a real estate company developing several Saskatoon properties.

Politics

1993 federal election

Cheveldayoff ran in the 1993 Canadian federal election for the Progressive Conservative Party in the riding of The Battlefords—Meadow Lake.  At the time the seat was held by Len Taylor of the New Democratic Party.  Cheveldayoff finished a distant fourth.

Saskatchewan Party MLA

First elected in November 2003, Cheveldayoff was the Opposition Critic for Finance, Deputy Critic for Learning (Post-Secondary Education), and was a member of the Public Accounts Committee.  He also served as Deputy Chair of the Standing Committee on Human Services. After being re-elected in 2007 as a member of the government, he was appointed to cabinet as the Minister of Crown Corporations. In a cabinet shuffle in 2009, he became Minister of Enterprise, and in 2010, he was appointed Minister of First Nations and Métis relations. On May 25, 2012, Cheveldayoff was appointed Minister of Environment, Responsible for SaskWater and the Water Security Agency.

In 2014, Cheveldayoff was appointed Government House Leader.

With the Cabinet shuffle on August 23, 2016, Cheveldayoff was asked by the Premier to serve as Minister of Parks, Culture, Sport and Minister responsible for the Public Service Commission (PSC).

On May 20, 2018 Cheveldayoff was caught trying to sell tickets outside a Winnipeg Jets NHL hockey game after being stood up by his buddy and his buddy's mom.

2018 leadership election
On August 28, 2017, Cheveldayoff announced his bid for the leadership of the Saskatchewan Party just days after party leader and Premier Brad Wall announced that he was retiring from politics. The Saskatchewan Party leadership vote, held on January 27, 2018, was won by Scott Moe.  Moe was sworn in as the 15th Premier of Saskatchewan six days later, on February 2.

During the campaign, in a response to a questionnaire from an anti-abortion group, Cheveldayoff stated that he doesn't believe rape victims should have legal access to abortion services, earning him the anti-abortion group's top rank out of the six leadership candidates.

Personal life
Cheveldayoff is married to Trish, a former news anchor at CFQC-TV, and the couple have two children. He is a member of various community organizations and Lakeview Free Methodist Church.

Cheveldayoff is the older brother of current Winnipeg Jets general manager, Kevin Cheveldayoff.

Electoral history

2016 Saskatchewan general election

2011 Saskatchewan general election

|-

 
|NDP
|Cindy Lee Sherban
|align="right"|2,242
|align="right"|21.62
|align="right"|-5.85

|- bgcolor="white"
!align="left" colspan=3|Total
!align="right"|10,371
!align="right"|100.00
!align="right"|

2007 Saskatchewan general election

|-

 
|NDP
|Gord Bedient
|align="right"|3,060
|align="right"|27.47
|align="right"|-11.52

|- bgcolor="white"
!align="left" colspan=3|Total
!align="right"|11,139
!align="right"|100.00
!align="right"|

2003 Saskatchewan general election

|-

 
|NDP
|Russell Scott
|align="right"|3,490
|align="right"|38.99
|align="right"|–

|- bgcolor="white"
!align="left" colspan=3|Total
!align="right"|8,952
!align="right"|100.00
!align="right"|

1993 Canadian general election The Battlefords—Meadow Lake

|- bgcolor="white"

References

External links
 Official website
 Cabinet biography

1965 births
21st-century Canadian politicians
Canadian Methodists
Doukhobors
Free Methodist Church members
Living people
Members of the Executive Council of Saskatchewan
Newport University (California) alumni
Politicians from Saskatoon
Saskatchewan Party MLAs